Irene Mill Finishing Plant, also known as the Cherokee Finishing Company, is a historic factory building located at Gaffney, Cherokee County, South Carolina, United States of America.  The building was constructed in 1915–1916, and is a large, rectangular, one-story brick building with a gable roof with exposed support beams. Also on the property are two small, square brick structures with pyramidal roofs covered with pressed metal shingles. The mill produced damask which was shipped to New England for finishing.  In the finishing plant the cloth was washed, soaked, boiled, bleached, and calendered, enabling the mill to produce finished damask products.

It was listed on the National Register of Historic Places in 1986.

References

Industrial buildings and structures on the National Register of Historic Places in South Carolina
Industrial buildings completed in 1916
Buildings and structures in Cherokee County, South Carolina
National Register of Historic Places in Cherokee County, South Carolina
Gaffney, South Carolina
Textile mills in South Carolina